Elias Titus House is a historic home located at Red Oaks Mill in Dutchess County, New York.  It was built in 1840 and originally consisted of a -story, gable-roofed main block and -story kitchen wing.  The main block is three bays wide and four bays deep.  It features a temple front elevation in the Greek Revival style.  It is a tetrastyle portico supported by fluted Ionic order columns.

It was added to the National Register of Historic Places in 2006.

References

Houses on the National Register of Historic Places in New York (state)
Greek Revival houses in New York (state)
Houses completed in 1840
Houses in Dutchess County, New York
National Register of Historic Places in Dutchess County, New York
Underground Railroad in New York (state)